The Ozunca is a left tributary of the river Baraolt in Romania. It discharges into the Baraolt near Biborțeni. The name Ozunca is used mostly for the upper reach of the river, while the name Bățani is used for the lower reach.

Tributaries

The following rivers are tributaries to the river Ozunca (from source to mouth):

Left: Valea cu Cireși, Pârâul Sărat, Valea Întunecoasă, Apa Roșie, Groapa Pârâului, Pârâul Șeii, Bodoș
Right: Pârâul cu Borviz, Păstrăvul, Valea cu Mure, Pârâul Șoptitor

References

Rivers of Romania
Rivers of Covasna County